The W34 was an American nuclear bomb developed and deployed during the mid-1960s.

The device core weighs  depending on model. Yield of the W34 was 11 kilotons.

The W34 was deployed in several applications: Mark 101 Lulu nuclear depth bomb, the Mark 45 ASTOR torpedo and the Mark 105 Hotpoint nuclear bomb.

The Mk 101 Lulu was manufactured from 1958, and deployed until final decommissioning in 1971.  A total of 2,000 were produced.  The Mark 45 ASTOR was produced from 1958 and used until 1976; 600 ASTOR were produced.  The Mark 105 bomb was produced from 1958 until 1965, with 600 having been produced.

The design of the W34 has been described as identical to the fission primary of the B28 nuclear bomb by some sources. That would place it in the Python primary family of nuclear weapons.  The dimensions and weight of the W34 are consistent with the W40 warhead, which is more solidly identified with the Python primary family of weapons.

See also
 B28 nuclear bomb
 List of nuclear weapons

References

External links
 Allbombs.html list of all US nuclear warheads at nuclearweaponarchive.org

Nuclear warheads of the United States
Military equipment introduced in the 1960s